Orange Walk Airport (now officially Alfredo Martinez Chan Pine Ridge Airstrip)  is a public use airport  southwest of Orange Walk Town, Orange Walk District, Belize. The airport was also known as Tower Hill Airport.

The gravel airstrip was refurbished with asphalt in 2014.

The original Orange Walk Airport was east of the town, but was closed sometime prior to 2001, and is now part of a highway bypass.

Airlines and destinations

See also

Transport in Belize
List of airports in Belize

References

External links 
OpenStreetMap - Orange Walk
OurAirports - Orange Walk Airport
Tower Hill renovation - YouTube

Airports in Belize
Orange Walk District